Taylor Ibera (born July 7, 1991 in Honolulu, Hawaii) is a judoka and wrestler from United States.

Bio
Ibera was born in Honolulu. Her home dojo is Hawaii Tenri Judo club. During studies at Farrington High School she was competing in judo and also in wrestling. In both sports she was very successful on national level.

Today she studies at San Jose State University sport medicine.

Judo
On national level she is two time winner of USA Judo National Championships in 2007 and 2008.

In 2009 (*- 48 kg) and 2010 she took bronze medal.

Her biggest success on international level is winning gold medal at 2008 Pan American Judo Championships in Miami. Next year at 2009 Pan American Judo Championships she took bronze medal.

Achievements

References

External links
 
 USA Judo

1991 births
Living people
American female judoka
21st-century American women